Faces of America is a four-part Public Broadcasting Service (PBS) Public television television series hosted by Professor Henry Louis Gates. The series originally aired February 10 – March 3, 2010 from 8–9 p.m. ET. In Australia, this program aired on SBS One each Sunday at 7:30pm from 9 -30 January 2011.

About 
It uses genealogical research and genetics to find the family history of 12 Americans: Elizabeth Alexander, Mario Batali, Stephen Colbert, Louise Erdrich, Malcolm Gladwell, Eva Longoria, Yo-Yo Ma, Mike Nichols, Queen Noor of Jordan, Dr. Mehmet Oz, Meryl Streep, and Kristi Yamaguchi.

In the series finale, Gates explored the emerging use of full genome sequencing to understand personal ancestry and health, by learning what might be inferred from his whole genome sequence, and that of his father, through in-depth analysis by a personal genomics company (Knome) and the Broad Institute.

In 2012, PBS aired Finding Your Roots, also examining questions of genealogy and genetics, hosted by Gates. This program became a ongoing series. As of 2022 it was still in production, and will present new episodes in early 2023.

Episodes

Reception 
Dave Walker of New Orleans Times-Picayune wrote "Surprising, fascinating, ultimately uniting."

See also 
 Ancestors in the Attic
 Who Do You Think You Are?

References

External links 
http://www.pbs.org/wnet/facesofamerica/
http://www.nytimes.com/2010/02/10/arts/television/10faces.html

PBS original programming
2010 American television series debuts
2010s American television miniseries
Historical television series
American genealogy
2010s American documentary television series
English-language television shows
New York University Press books
Television series about family history
Works about genetics